Champlin is a city in Hennepin County, Minnesota, United States.  The population was 23,919 at the 2020 census.  Champlin is a northern suburb of Minneapolis.

U.S. Highway 169 and Hennepin County Road 12 (CR 12) are two of the main routes in Champlin.

Geography

History

The Champlin area was first settled when Father Louis Hennepin, a Franciscan priest from whom Hennepin County gets its name, Michael Accult, and Peter Dulay were captured by Lakota Indians. An Indian trading post was later established in the area. Charles Miles created the first permanent settlement in what came to be named Marshall Township. In 1859, it was split into two towns, Champlin and Dayton.
 
Champlin's name came from U.S. Navy Commodore Stephen Champlin. He was active in the war against England and Canada in 1812, and in the establishment of the Canadian–United States boundary. He died in 1870 in Buffalo, New York.

On August 30, 1853, Stephen Champlin's daughter, Eliza Ellen Champlin, married John B. Cook, a partner of Minnesota's Alexander Ramsey. Although Cook was never a resident of Champlin, he was involved in real estate transactions there, and in its incorporation. In 1947, part of the former Champlin Township was incorporated to form the village of Champlin, and on January 2, 1971, as the result of a petitioned order from the Minnesota Municipal Commission, Champlin Township and the village of Champlin consolidated to form the city of Champlin.

Education
The Champlin area is served by Anoka-Hennepin School District 11, with four primary schools, Champlin-Brooklyn Park Academy for Math and Environmental Science, Oxbow Creek Elementary, Jackson Middle School and Champlin Park High School. All the schools are clustered in a neighborhood near the intersection of 109th Avenue North and Douglas Avenue North. Oxbow Creek Elementary School is in Brooklyn Park.

Champlin Elementary School was built in 1938 to serve the primary educational needs of Champlin's schoolchildren. Champlin Elementary School received students directly from the Park View Early Childhood Center (converted to the Champlin-Brooklyn Park Academy for Math and Environmental Science in 2011). It closed in summer 2010, due to financial cuts in the district, and has been put up for sale by the city. It merged with Riverview Elementary School to make the Champlin–Brooklyn Academy of Math and Environmental Science. Students began attending the new school during the 2010–11 school year.

Champlin Park High School is one of the largest high schools in the state, with approximately 2,975 students in 9th through 12th grades. It is in the Northwest Suburban Conference with large athletic and music programs. Champlin Park High receives students directly from Jackson Middle School.

Jackson Middle School was expanded in 2001 to become one of the largest junior high schools in the state of Minnesota. This was accomplished by the building of a completely new campus for Oxbow Creek Elementary about two blocks southwest of the existing campus. Jackson Middle School then expanded into the former Oxbow Creek Elementary building. In 2006, Jackson Middle School built an observatory, which hosts public viewing nights and provides astronomy education to both its and other Anoka–Hennepin students. Jackson Middle School is home to approximately 2,356 students in 6th through 8th grades. It receives students directly from Champlin-Brooklyn Park Academy for Math and Environmental Science, Dayton Elementary School, Oxbow Creek Elementary, and Monroe Elementary.

Oxbow Creek Elementary's new facility opened in 2001. It is an exact match to Rum River Elementary School, as the school district used the same blueprints to build the two at the same time. Oxbow Creek Elementary provides educational services to 1,090 students in kindergarten through 5th grades.

Champlin–Brooklyn Park Academy for Math and Environmental Science, formerly Park View Kindergarten, provides kindergarten through 5th grade math and environmental science education.

Demographics

2010 census
As of the census of 2010, there were 24,710 people, 8,328 households, and 6,305 families living in the city. The racial makeup of the city was 89.0% White, 4.8% African American, 0.4% Native American, 3.1% Asian, 0.5% from other races, and 2.2% from two or more races. Hispanic or Latino of any race were 2.0% of the population.

There were 8,328 households, of which 40.5% had children under the age of 18 living with them, 61.4% were married couples living together, 9.6% had a female householder with no husband present, 4.7% had a male householder with no wife present, and 24.3% were non-families. 18.8% of all households were made up of individuals, and 5.6% had someone living alone who was 65 years of age or older. The average household size was 2.77 and the average family size was 3.18.

The median age in the city was 36.8 years. 26.9% of residents were under the age of 18; 8.8% were between the ages of 18 and 24; 27.1% were from 25 to 44; 30.5% were from 45 to 64; and 6.7% were 65 years of age or older. The gender makeup of the city was 50.2% male and 49.8% female.

2000 census
As of the census of 2000, there were 22,193 people, 7,425 households, and 5,925 families living in the city. The racial makeup of the city was 95.01% White, 1.41% African-American, 0.43% Native American, 1.65% Asian, 0.02% Pacific Islander, 0.37% from other races, and 1.10% from two or more races. Hispanic or Latino of any race were 1.13% of the population.

There were 7,425 households, out of which 50.5% had children under the age of 18 living with them, 67.4% were married couples living together, 8.6% had a female householder with no husband present, and 20.2% were non-families. 14.9% of all households were made up of individuals, and 2.6% had someone living alone who was 65 years of age or older.  The average household size was 2.99 and the average family size was 3.35.

In the city, the population was spread out, with 33.6% under the age of 18, 7.0% from 18 to 24, 38.4% from 25 to 44, 17.4% from 45 to 64, and 3.7% who were 65 years of age or older.  The median age was 32 years. For every 100 females, there were 101.5 males.  For every 100 females age 18 and over, there were 99.4 males.

The median income for a household in the city was $85,831, and the median income for a family was $98,890. Males had a median income of $45,390 versus $32,277 for females. The per capita income for the city was $24,041.  About 2.3% of families and 2.5% of the population were below the poverty line, including 3.5% of those under age 18 and 0.8% of those age 65 or over.

Government

City Council
The mayor of Champlin is Ryan Sabas. He serves on the Champlin City Council along with current Ward 1 Council member Jessica Tesdall, Ward 2 Council member Tom Moe, Ward 3 Council member Nate Truesdell, and Ward 4 Council member is vacant.

Administration
Champlin is managed on a daily basis by the city administrator and subordinate department heads. The city administrator is Bret Heitkamp, with assistance from Judith Szeliga.

Police
The Champlin Police Department is composed of 26 sworn officers, two community service officers, 15 police explorers, and a civilian support staff of three full-time and three part-time employees. Champlin police officers are dispatched via the Hennepin County Sheriff's Department Communication Division in Golden Valley. The police department is on the city campus at 11955 Champlin Drive.

The police department moved to the new city of Champlin Public Safety Facility in February 2008. The new facility provides the police department with adequate space and facilities into the foreseeable future. Among its many features, it includes indoor parking and storage to protect police vehicles.

Fire
Champlin's fire services are provided by the joint Anoka-Champlin Fire Department. Champlin and Anoka have shared a fire department since 1985, with individual fire stations in each city. The Anoka-Champlin Fire Department moved to the new Champlin Public Safety Facility in March 2008. The new facility has three fire truck bays and should meet the city's fire protection needs for the foreseeable future.

The fire department has a force of 41 volunteer firefighters.

One of the most traditional fire departments in Minnesota, the Anoka-Champlin Fire Department is distinguished by its tradition of using white vehicles, a nod to the days when Anoka firefighters used white horses to pull their steam fire engines. When motorized vehicles replaced the horse-drawn engines, the department selected white for the color of its motorized equipment.

Notable people
Darby Nelson (1940 – 2022), writer and politician, lived in Champlin.
Kimberly Potter (born June 18, 1972), former Brooklyn Center police officer and veteran since 1995, who accidentally killed 20-year-old Plymouth citizen Daunte Wright was born and raised in Champlin.

Festival
Each year, generally on the second weekend in June, Champlin holds the Father Hennepin Festival. The celebration began in 1976 to recognize Champlin's history.

Recreation 
The Champlin Mill Pond is within city limits on the northeast corner of 169 and Hayden Lake Road. It is stocked with several species of panfish by the Minnesota DNR, and has a fishing pier, pavilion and park with picnic tables and grills.

References

External links
 City Website

Cities in Minnesota
Minnesota populated places on the Mississippi River
Cities in Hennepin County, Minnesota
Populated places established in 1852
1852 establishments in Minnesota Territory